Percy Lewis may refer to:

 Percy Lewis (Australian cricketer) (1864–1922), Australian cricketer, played first-class cricket Victoria 1883–96
 Percy Lewis, known as Plum Lewis (1884–1976), South African cricketer who played in one Test in 1913
 Percy Lewis (boxer) (1927–2019), Trinidad and Tobago/British boxer
 Percy Lewis (football manager), English football manager
 Percy Parke Lewis (1885–1962), American architect